The 2006 Men's World Ice Hockey Championships is the 11th such event hosted by the International Ice Hockey Federation. It took place  between July 10 and July 16, 2006.

The preliminary round was played in four groups (A-D) with four teams each. The groups A and B form Pool A, the groups C and D form Pool B.

The two last-placed teams of the groups A and B and the two first-placed teams of the groups C and D play for fourth place in group A and B to participate in the Play-Offs of Pool A. The losers of the games between fourth A and first C, fourth B and first D play as first place in group C and D to participate in the Play-Offs of Pool B. The ranking of the groups is based according to the result of the last World Championships performance of the respective countries in the IIHF Inline Hockey Program and the qualification rounds.

Top Division

Preliminary round

Group A

Group B

Qualifying round

Austria remains in Top Division, Hungary remains in Division I

Slovenia remains in Top Division, Great Britain remains in Division I

Championship Round

Draw 

Note: * denotes overtime period(s).

Placement games
7th place game

5th place game

Ranking and statistics

Final standings
The final standings of the tournament according to IIHF:

Division I

Qualification

European Zone
Played in Pfaffenhofen, Germany

Preliminary round

Group C

Group D

Finals round

Draw

Placement games
7th place game

5th place game

Ranking and statistics

Final standings
The final standings of the tournament according to IIHF:

IIHF InLine Hockey World Championship
Iihf Mens Inline Hockey World Championship, 2006
2006 in Hungarian sport
International sports competitions hosted by Hungary